Santa Catarina was a  destroyer of the Brazilian Navy, serving from 1910 to 1944. She was named after the Brazilian state of Santa Catarina.

Description and Construction

Steam for the turbines was provided by two double-ended Yarrow boilers.

The ship mounted two  guns in single mounts. In addition, four 47 mm (3pdr) cannons in single mounts were deployed at the time of launching.

The official full speed trial for Santa Catarina took place on February 2, 1910 on the Skelmorlie deep-water measured mile at the mouth of the Clyde. During a continuous three hour run with a 100 ton load, the ship exceeded her contract speed of 27 knots.

References

Bibliography 
 "Santa Catarina II." Serviço de Documentação da Marinha — Histórico de Navios. Diretoria do Patrimônio Histórico e Documentação da Marinha, Departamento de História Marítima. Accessed 27 August 2017.
 Gardiner, Robert and Randal Gray, eds. Conway's All the World's Fighting Ships 1906–1921. Annapolis: Naval Institute Press, 1985. . .
 "CT Santa Catarina - CT 9." Navios De Guerra Brasileiros. Accessed 27 August 2017.

Pará-class destroyers (1908)
1909 ships
Ships built in Glasgow